Newnan Springs is an unincorporated community in Catoosa County, in the U.S. state of Georgia.

Etymology
The community was named for Daniel Newnan.

References

Unincorporated communities in Catoosa County, Georgia
Unincorporated communities in Georgia (U.S. state)